The uplands of the north and west of England enjoy the wettest climate and are home to the majority of waterfalls in the country.  In areas such as the Lake District which were formerly glaciated, they are commonly found at the lower ends of hanging valleys. Typical of those in the Pennines, are falls which form at points where the watercourse encounters erosion-resistant rock layers such as Millstone Grit.

Names of falls

The great majority of named falls in England are situated in the Lake District and Pennines. In these regions the terms ‘foss’ and ‘force’ are much the most common ones used for a waterfall though linn is also encountered towards the Scottish border. The term ‘spout’ is another frequently found alternative.

Alphabetical tables of named waterfalls

A

B

C

D,E

F

G

H

I,J

K

L

M

N,O

P,Q

R

S

T

U,V,W,X,Y,Z

See also
Waterfalls of the UK
Waterfalls of Scotland
Waterfalls of Wales

References
 Ordnance Survey 1:25,000 scale Explorer map series, sheets 101-346

Waterfalls
England